This article is about the demographic features of the population of the area which is commonly described as Palestinian territories and includes information on ethnicity, education level, health of the populace, economic status, religious affiliations and other aspects of that population.

According to a commonly used definition as relating to an application of the 1949 Armistice Agreement green line, the Palestinian territories have contributory parts of the West Bank (including East Jerusalem) and the Gaza Strip.

The Palestinian National Authority, the United Nations Security Council, the United Nations General Assembly, the European Union, the International Court of Justice, and the International Committee of the Red Cross use the terminology "Palestinian territories" or "occupied Palestinian territories". Israel refers to the administrative division encompassing Israeli-controlled Jewish-majority civilian areas of Area C of the West Bank, excluding East Jerusalem, as Judea and Samaria Area (Ezor Yehuda VeShomron).

Overview

The demographic statistics of The World Factbook and the Israel Central Bureau of Statistics estimated that the collective Palestinian Arab population in the region of Palestine, including Israel, the West Bank, and the Gaza Strip, amounted to 5.79 million people in 2017. Thereof, 2.16 million Arabs live in the West Bank, 1.84 million Arabs live in Israel, and 1.79 million Arabs live in the Gaza Strip.

The demographic statistics of The World Factbook and the Israel Central Bureau of Statistics estimated (2017) that the collective population in the Palestinian territories amounted to 4,543,126 people in 2017. Thereof, 2,155,743 Arabs live in the West Bank, 1,795,183 Arabs live in the Gaza Strip, and 391,000 Jews live in the West Bank. Approximately 214,600 Jews live in East Jerusalem. East Jerusalem, once administered by Jordan, came under Israeli occupation after the 1967 Six-Day War. In the Palestinian territories, c. 86% of the population is Arab (predominantly Sunni), c. 13% is Jewish, other <1% (cf. Israel: Jewish 74%, Arab 21%, other 5%).

According to the UN, the population in the State of Palestine was c. 4.9 million in 2017, resulting in an estimated population density of 817 capita per km2. According to the Palestinian Central Bureau of Statistics (PCBS), the number of Palestinians in the Palestinian Territory was 3,935,249 in 2009, resulting in a calculated population density of 654 capita per km2, of which 433 capita/km2 in the West Bank including Jerusalem and 4,073 capita/km2 in Gaza Strip. In the mid-2009, the share of population less than 15 years was 41.9% and above 65 years 3%.

Out of 224 listed countries and territories, the West Bank ranked 48th with a total fertility rate (TFR) of 3.2, and the Gaza Strip ranked 31st with a TFR of 3.97 according to The World Factbook in 2018. In 2018, the West Bank had an estimated population growth rate of 1.81% (country comparison to the world: 56th) and the Gaza Strip had a population growth rate of 2.25% (35th).

Vital statistics

UN estimates

Births and deaths

Population pyramids
	
Census (01/12/2007) :

	
Estimates (01/07/2013) :

Source:

Palestinian Central Bureau

Source:

Life expectancy  
Average life expectancy at age 0 of the total population.

Demographics of the West Bank

The following demographic statistics are from The World Factbook, unless otherwise indicated.

Population
Total 2,939,418 (July 2018 est.); 71.72% of the population is Arab (predominantly Sunni), 28.28% is Jewish (cf. Israel: Jewish 74%, Arab 21%, other 5%; and Gaza: Arab 99%) 

 Palestinian Arab 2,155,743 (July 2017 est.), 71.72%
 Israeli Jew 850,481 (2016, 2020 est.), 28.28% 
 approximately 475,481 Israeli Jews thereof live in the West Bank (2020)
 approximately 375,000 Israeli Jews thereof live in East Jerusalem (2016)

Age structure
0–14 years: 36.1% (male 518,376/female 491,676)

15–24 years: 21.8% (male 302,474/female 289,852)

25–54 years: 34.5% (male 489,559/female 475,402)

55–64 years: 4.7% (male 68,317/female 64,233)

65 years and over: 3.5% (male 44,662/female 53,943) (2018 est.)

Population growth rate
1.81% (2018 est.)

Birth rate
26 births/1,000 population (2018 est.)

Mortality rate
3.5 deaths/1,000 population (2018 est.)

Net migration rate
-4.4 migrant(s)/1,000 population (2018 est.)

Sex ratio
at birth: 1.06 male(s)/female

0–14 years: 1.05 male(s)/female

15–24 years: 1.04 male(s)/female

25–54 years: 1.03 male(s)/female

55–64 years: 1.06 male(s)/female

65 years and over: 0.73 male(s)/female

total population: 1.04 male(s)/female (2017 est.)

Infant mortality rate
total: 13.6 deaths/1,000 live births
male: 15.3 deaths/1,000 live births
female: 11.9 deaths/1,000 live births (2018 est.)

Life expectancy at birth
total population: 75.4 years
male: 73.4 years
female: 77.6 years (2018 est.)

Total fertility rate
3.2 children born/woman (2018 est.)
 Jewish population: 5.07 children born/woman (West Bank alone)

Nationality
noun: Arabs: Palestinian

Ethnic groups
Palestinian Arab: 83%Israeli Jewish and other: 17%

Religions
Muslim 80–85% (predominantly Sunni)Jewish 12–14%Christian 1.0–2.5%, (mainly Greek Orthodox)Other religious minorities include Palestinian Metawalis, Palestinian Druze and Palestinian Baha'is.

Languages
Arabic, English (compulsory in schools, widely spoken by Palestinians), and Hebrew (spoken by Israeli Jews in the West Bank, and spoken by many Palestinians) are commonly known.

Literacy
definition: age 15 and over can read and writetotal population: 96.9%male: 98.6%female: 95.2% (2016 est.)

Demographics of the Gaza Strip
The following demographic statistics are from The World Factbook, unless otherwise indicated.

Population

Current: 1,836,713 (July 2018 est.)

In 2010 approximately 1.6 million Palestinians lived in the Gaza Strip, almost 1.0 million of them UN-registered refugees.

The Strip's population has continued to increase since that time, one of the main reasons being a total fertility rate of 4.24 children per woman (2014 est). In a ranking by total fertility rate, this places Gaza 34th of 224 regions.

Age structure

0–14 years: 44.1% (male 415,746/female 394,195)15–24 years: 21.3% (male 197,797/female 194,112)25–54 years: 28.5% (male 256,103/female 267,285)55–64 years: 3.5% (male 33,413/female 30,592)65 years and over: 2.6% (male 24,863/female 22,607) (2018 est.)

Population growth rate

2.25% (2018 est.)

Birth rate

30.5 births/1,000 population (2018 est.)

Mortality rate

3 deaths/1,000 population (2018 est.)

Net migration rate

-5 migrant(s)/1,000 population (2018 est.)

Sex ratio

at birth: 1.06 male(s)/female0–14 years: 1.05 male(s)/female15–24 years: 1.01 male(s)/female25–54 years: 0.96 male(s)/female55–64 years: 1.1 male(s)/female65 years and over: 0.71 male(s)/femaletotal population: 1.02 male(s)/female (2017 est.)

Infant mortality rate

total population: 16/1,000 live birthsmale: 17.1/1,000 live birthsfemale: 14.9/1,000 live births (2018 est.)

Life expectancy at birth

total population: 74.4 yearsmale: 72.7 yearsfemale: 76.2 years (2018 est.)

Total fertility rate

3.97 children born/woman (2018 est.)

Nationality

noun:
Palestinians
adjective:
Palestinian

Ethnic groups

Arab (Palestinian) 98.7%

Religions

Sunni Muslim 98–99%, Arab Christians 0.2% (2,000 to 3,000 est.), other, unaffiliated, unspecified <1.0% (2012 est.).

Languages

Arabic, Hebrew (spoken by many older Gaza Palestinians), English (widely understood)

Literacy

definition: age 15 and over can read and writetotal population: 96.9%male: 98.6%female: 95.2% (2016 est.)

See also
 Demographic history of Palestine (region)
 Demographics of Israel
 Demographics of the Middle East
 Economy of the Palestinian territories
 Genetic history of the Middle East
 Palestinian National Authority (PNA)
 Politics of the Palestinian National Authority
 Population statistics for Israeli West Bank settlements

References

External links
 The World Factbook
 Forbes, Andrew, and Henley, David, People of Palestine (Chiang Mai: Cognoscenti Books, 2012), ASIN: B0094TU8VY
 "Demography of the Palestinian population with special emphasis on the occupied territories", 1995 paper by Arjun L. Adlakha, Kevin G. Kinsella and Marwan Khawaja. Available at Population Bulletin of ESCWA's website.

Palestinian territories
Demographics of the Middle East
Palestinian territories
Society of the State of Palestine